CCTV International may refer to:
 CCTV-4, CCTV International in the Mandarin language
 CCTV News (English), CCTV International in the English language
 CCTV International Spanish
 CCTV International French
 CCTV International Russian
 CCTV International Arabic